Penicillium klebahnii is a species of the genus of Penicillium.

References

klebahnii
Fungi described in 1979